Michele Arcari (born 27 June 1978, in Annicco) is a retired Italian association football goalkeeper. He is currently working as a youth coach at Brescia.

Caps in Italian League Divisions

Serie A: 2 caps

Serie B: 79 caps

Serie C1: 109 caps

Serie C2: 73 caps

Serie D: 61 caps

Total: 324 caps

References

External links
Career profile (from aic.it)

Living people
1978 births
Italian footballers
Serie A players
Serie B players
U.S. Cremonese players
Calcio Lecco 1912 players
Brescia Calcio players
Aurora Pro Patria 1919 players
A.S. Pizzighettone players
Association football goalkeepers
Sportspeople from the Province of Cremona
Footballers from Lombardy